Thomas (the Tank Engine) & Friends is a children's television series about the engines and other characters working on the railways of the Island of Sodor, and is based on The Railway Series books written by the Reverend W. Awdry.

This article lists episodes from the 10th Series of this show, which was first broadcast in 2006. This series was narrated by Michael Angelis for the UK audiences, while Michael Brandon narrated the episodes for the US audiences.

Most episodes in this series have two titles: the original titles from the UK broadcasts are shown on top, while the American-adapted titles are shown underneath. 

This was the last series to utilize the instrumental chorus of the Engine Roll Call in the opening sequence. Starting from Series 11, the lyrics were incorporated into the theme sequence and sung by children. Starting with this series, all 30-minute episodes included only two mini-episodes.

This was Jocelyn Stevenson's last series as executive producer. Sharon Miller remained as script editor.

Episodes

Characters

Introduced
 Rosie ("Thomas and the Birthday Mail")
 Freddie ("Fearless Freddie")
 Rocky ("Edward Strikes Out")
 Jeremy ("Thomas and the Jet Plane")

Recurring cast

 Thomas
 Edward
 Henry
 Gordon
 James
 Percy
 Toby
 Emily
 Diesel
 Mavis
 Salty
 Harvey
 Spencer
 Skarloey
 Rheneas
 Sir Handel
 Peter Sam
 Rusty
 Duncan
 Mighty Mac
 Troublesome Trucks
 The Chinese Dragon
 Bertie
 Harold
 Cranky
 The Fat Controller
 Lady Hatt
 Stephen Hatt
 Bridget Hatt
 Farmer McColl
 The Thin Controller
 Annie and Clarabel (do not speak)
 Henrietta (does not speak)
 Sodor Brass Band (do not speak)
 The Duke and Duchess of Boxford (do not speak)
 Bill and Ben (cameos)
 Molly (cameo)
 Trevor (cameo)
 Bulgy (cameo)
 George (cameo)
 Butch (cameo)
 Jem Cole (cameo)
 Farmer Trotter (cameo)
 The Refreshment Lady (cameo)
 Cyril (cameo)

References

2006 British television seasons
Thomas & Friends seasons